Quentin Tarantino's Inglourious Basterds: Motion Picture Soundtrack is the soundtrack to Quentin Tarantino's motion picture Inglourious Basterds. It was originally released on August 18, 2009. The soundtrack uses a variety of music genres, including Spaghetti Western soundtrack excerpts, R&B and a David Bowie song from the 1982 remake of Cat People. "The Man with the Big Sombrero", a song from the 1943 screwball comedy Hi Diddle Diddle, was rerecorded in French for the movie. This is the first soundtrack for a Quentin Tarantino film not to feature dialogue excerpts. The album was nominated for a Grammy Award for Best Compilation Soundtrack Album for a Motion Picture, Television or Other Visual Media, but lost to the Slumdog Millionaire soundtrack.

Track listing
 "The Green Leaves of Summer" – Nick Perito & His Orchestra
 "The Verdict (La Condanna)" – Ennio Morricone (mislabeled "Dopo la condanna") (from La resa dei conti)
 "White Lightning (Main Title)" – Charles Bernstein (from White Lightning)
 "Slaughter" – Billy Preston (from Slaughter)
 "The Surrender (La resa)" – Ennio Morricone (from La resa dei conti)
 "One Silver Dollar (Un Dollaro Bucato)" – Gianni Ferrio (from Un dollaro bucato)
 "Davon geht die Welt nicht unter" – Zarah Leander
 "The Man with the Big Sombrero" – Samantha Shelton & Michael Andrew (original English-language version by June Havoc from Hi Diddle Diddle)
 "Ich wollt' ich wär' ein Huhn" – Lilian Harvey & Willy Fritsch
 "Main Theme from Dark of the Sun" – Jacques Loussier (from Dark of the Sun)
 "Cat People (Putting Out Fire)" – David Bowie (from Cat People)
 "Tiger Tank" – Lalo Schifrin (from Kelly's Heroes)
 "Un Amico" – Ennio Morricone  (from Revolver)
 "Rabbia e Tarantella" – Ennio Morricone (from Allonsanfàn)

Film music not included on the album
 "L'incontro Con La Figlia" – Ennio Morricone  (from Il ritorno di Ringo)
 "Il Mercenario (ripresa)" – Ennio Morricone (from Il mercenario)
 "Algiers November 1, 1954" – Ennio Morricone & Gillo Pontecorvo (from La battaglia di Algeri)
 "Hound Chase (intro)" – Charles Bernstein (from White Lightning)
 "The Saloon" – Riz Ortolani (from Al di là della legge)
 "Bath Attack" – Charles Bernstein (from The Entity)
 "Claire's First Appearance" – Jacques Loussier (from Dark of the Sun)
 "The Fight" – Jacques Loussier (from Dark of the Sun)
 "Mystic and Severe" – Ennio Morricone (from Da uomo a uomo)
 "The Devil's Rumble" – Davie Allan & The Arrows
 "What'd I Say" – Rare Earth
 "Zulus" – Elmer Bernstein (from Zulu Dawn)
 "Eastern Condors" – Ting Yat Chung  (from Eastern Condors)
 "Titoli" – Angelo Francesco Lavagnino (from The Last Days of Pompeii) – used as the opening titles for the film-within-a-film, Nation's Pride

Promotional video
A music video for the French-language version of "The Man with the Big Sombrero" was directed by Meiert Avis. Using the scene of the movie Hi Diddle Diddle where the song was originally performed by June Havoc, singer Samantha Shelton was digitally inserted into the scene, carefully mimicking the exact choreography done by Havoc in the previous film.

Personnel
 Executive Producer: Quentin Tarantino
 Music Supervisor: Mary Ramos
 Soundtrack Producers: Lawrence Bender, Pilar Savone, and Holly Adams

References

External links
Official soundtrack website

2009 soundtrack albums